Major General Jens Anderson Doe (20 June 1891 – 25 February 1971) was a senior United States Army officer who fought with distinction in both World War I and World War II. He is best known for his command of the 41st Infantry Division in the South West Pacific Area during World War II.

Education and early life
Jens Anderson Doe was born on 20 June 1891 in Chicago, Illinois to Norwegian immigrant parents. He graduated from the United States Military Academy (USMA) at West Point, New York and was commissioned as a second lieutenant in the 11th Infantry on 12 June 1914. Among his classmates there were several future general officers, such as Carl Spaatz, Brehon B. Somervell, James B. Cress, Frank W. Milburn, Robert W. Crawford, Dabney O. Elliott, Harold R. Bull, Paul C. Paschal, John B. Anderson, John Henry Woodberry, Ralph Royce, Vicente Lim, Sylvester DeWitt Jr., Benjamin G. Weir, James L. Bradley, Harold Francis Loomis, Francis R. Kerr, Joseph Wilson Byron, William Ord Ryan, Charles P. Gross, Charles M. Milliken, John B. Thompson, Orlando Ward, Harry C. Ingles, LaRhett L. Stuart, and William H. Holcombe. Doe was initially stationed with the 11th Infantry successively at Texas City, Texas, Naco, Arizona, and Douglas, Arizona.

World War I
Doe was promoted to first lieutenant on 1 July 1916 and captain on 15 May 1917, a few weeks after the American entry into World War I. From May to August 1917 he was stationed with the 11th Infantry at Fort Oglethorpe. He attended a machine gun training course at Fort Sill before assuming command of the 15th Machine Gun Battalion, part of the newly created 5th Division, in December 1917. In April 1918, he sailed for France.

Promoted to the temporary rank of major on 7 June 1918, Doe served as the 5th Division's Machine Gun Officer  before assuming command of the 14th Machine Gun Battalion, also of the 5th Division, in July. As such, he participated in the Battle of Saint-Mihiel and the subsequent Meuse–Argonne offensive, the largest battle in the history of the United States Army, where he was wounded, although his gallantry earned him the Silver Star.

In November 1918, the same month the Armistice with Germany brought the war to an end, Doe organised and became an instructor at the Army Machine Gun School at Langres. He was an instructor at the II Corps Schools, and a student at the Artillery Center. In June 1919 he joined the 61st Infantry, returning to the United States with it in June 1919.

Between the wars
In September 1919 he became an instructor at the Infantry School at Fort Benning. He attended the Field Officers' Course in 1921-1922, after which he was assigned to the 2nd Infantry at Fort Sheridan, Illinois, as a machine gun officer at Fort Custer, and to the USMA at West Point.

Doe attended the United States Army Command and General Staff College at Fort Leavenworth from 1925 to 1926 and on graduation was posted to the 15th Infantry at Tientsin, China. He did not return to the United States until 1930, when he joined the 16th Infantry at Fort Jay. He then commanded the machine gun school at Fort Dix until 1932, when he left to attend the United States Army War College. After nearly 18 years as a major, he was finally promoted to lieutenant colonel on 1 January 1936. He was an instructor at the Command and General Staff College and Professor of Military Science and Tactics at the University of California, Berkeley.

World War II

Doe joined the newly reformed 7th Division at Fort Ord in September 1940 and became both the executive officer (XO) and commanding officer (CO) of the 1st Battalion, 17th Infantry Regiment, part of the 7th Division. He was to hold this post until February 1941. After assuming command of the regiment in March 1941, he was promoted to colonel on 1 July 1941.

In June 1942, six months after the United States entered World War II, Doe relinquished command of the regiment and was sent to Australia to command the 163rd Infantry.

The 163rd Infantry was selected as the first regiment of the 41st Infantry Division to enter combat, at Sanananda in January 1943. For his leadership, Doe was awarded the Distinguished Service Cross. His citation read:

This action also resulted in Doe becoming the Assistant Division Commander (ADC) and being promoted to the temporary rank of brigadier general on 2 February 1943, while his permanent rank was promoted from lieutenant colonel to colonel on the same date.

Doe led the Persecution Task Force that landed at Aitape, and the Tornado Task Force that landed at Wakde, both of which were built around the 163rd Infantry. When Sixth Army commander Lt. Gen. Walter Krueger tried to visit him at his headquarters on 26 April 1944, he found that Doe had gone to the front lines to be with his men. For these actions he was awarded the Army Distinguished Service Medal.

His task force was absorbed back into the 41st Infantry Division for the Battle of Biak. In this battle he earned an oak leaf cluster to the Silver Star he had won in the Great War. His citation read:

At Biak the commander of the 41st Infantry Division, Major General Horace H. Fuller asked to be relieved of his command. Both Fuller and Major General Robert L. Eichelberger, commanding I Corps, had recommended Doe for the next available divisional command, so Doe assumed command of the 41st Infantry Division and was promoted to the temporary rank of major general on 1 August 1944. For his leadership at Biak he was also awarded an oak leaf cluster to his Distinguished Service Medal.

In February and March 1945, Doe led 41st Infantry Division at Palawan and Zamboanga, where he earned a second oak leaf cluster to his Silver Star. His citation read:

Doe also received the Air Medal for his numerous flights over Japanese held areas.

Later life
Doe remained in command of the 41st Infantry Division until it was inactivated in Japan at midnight on 31 December 1945. He returned to the United States for a brief tour of duty at the War Department before assuming command of the 5th Infantry Division, with which he had served in World War I, at Fort Campbell on 9 August 1946. On 29 September 1946 he assumed command of the 3rd Infantry Division and, from July 1947 until February 1949, he took command of the 4th Infantry Division

Doe was promoted to the permanent rank of major general on 24 January 1948, backdated to 6 September 1944. He retired from the army in February 1949 and settled in Carmel, California. Doe died there on 25 February 1971, at the age of 79. He was buried at the West Point Cemetery on 3 March 1971.

References

Bibliography

External links
Generals of World War II

|-

|-
 

|-
 

1891 births
1971 deaths
Military personnel from Chicago
American people of Norwegian descent
United States Military Academy alumni
United States Army Infantry Branch personnel
United States Army personnel of World War I
Recipients of the Silver Star
United States Army Command and General Staff College alumni
United States Army War College alumni
United States Army Command and General Staff College faculty
University of California, Berkeley faculty
Recipients of the Distinguished Service Cross (United States)
United States Army generals of World War II
Recipients of the Air Medal
United States Army generals
Recipients of the Distinguished Service Medal (US Army)
People from Carmel-by-the-Sea, California
Burials at West Point Cemetery